Mathias Rasmussen (born 25 November 1997) is a Norwegian professional footballer who plays as a midfielder for Brann.

Career
After previously playing for the club Lyngdal, he came to Start in 2014.

On 15 July 2016 Rasmussen signed for Danish Superliga side Nordsjælland.

Career statistics

Club

References

External links

1997 births
Living people
People from Lyngdal
Sportspeople from Agder
Norwegian footballers
Association football midfielders
Eliteserien players
Danish Superliga players
IK Start players
FC Nordsjælland players
SK Brann players
Norwegian expatriate footballers
Norwegian expatriate sportspeople in Denmark
Expatriate men's footballers in Denmark